

223001–223100 

|-bgcolor=#f2f2f2
| colspan=4 align=center | 
|}

223101–223200 

|-bgcolor=#f2f2f2
| colspan=4 align=center | 
|}

223201–223300 

|-bgcolor=#f2f2f2
| colspan=4 align=center | 
|}

223301–223400 

|-id=360
| 223360 Švankmajer ||  || Jan Švankmajer (born 1934), a Czech graphic artist and film-maker, well known for his surreal, nightmarish as well as somewhat funny pictures, creations and animations. Among his best known movies are Alice, Faust and Conspirators of Pleasure, as well as his animations and gadgets of comedy Dinner for Adele || 
|}

223401–223500 

|-bgcolor=#f2f2f2
| colspan=4 align=center | 
|}

223501–223600 

|-id=566
|  223566 Petignat ||  || Gautier Petignat (born 1941), an active member of the Jura Astronomy Society in Switzerland || 
|}

223601–223700 

|-id=633
|  223633 Rosnyaîné ||  || J.-H. Rosny aîné (1856–1940), a French author of Belgian origin, considered to be one of the fathers of modern science fiction || 
|-id=685
|  223685 Hartopp ||  || Ramon Hartopp (born 1965) has displayed great enthusiasm for the popularization and dissemination of astronomy and astronautics through courses, conferences and magazine articles, despite being autistic and having Asperger Syndrome. He is a member of AACastelldefels. || 
|}

223701–223800 

|-bgcolor=#f2f2f2
| colspan=4 align=center | 
|}

223801–223900 

|-id=877
|  223877 Kutler ||  || Brendan Kutler (1992–2009), an accomplished programmer, scientist, artist, Japanese scholar, tennis player and music editor for the online magazine The 8th Circuit, lifted fellow Summer Science Program alumni with his brilliance and selfless, upbeat attitude throughout their minor-planet orbit-determination project. || 
|}

223901–224000 

|-id=950
|  223950 Mississauga ||  || Mississauga, Ontario, is Canada's sixth largest city. || 
|}

References 

223001-224000